Justine Henin won in the final 6–2, 6–2 against Sandrine Testud.

Seeds
A champion seed is indicated in bold text while text in italics indicates the round in which that seed was eliminated. The top two seeds received a bye to the second round.

  Mary Pierce (semifinals)
  Elena Dementieva (quarterfinals)
  Chanda Rubin (quarterfinals)
  Sandrine Testud (final)
  Magdalena Maleeva (second round)
  Patty Schnyder (second round)
  Nathalie Dechy (semifinals)
  Silvija Talaja (first round)

Draw

Final

Section 1

Section 2

Qualifying

Seeds

  Iva Majoli (first round)
  Shinobu Asagoe (withdrew, moved to the Main Draw)
 n/a
  Karina Habšudová (second round)
  Marissa Irvin (first round)
  Nadejda Ostrovskaya (first round)
  Janet Lee (final round)
  Dawn Buth (first round)
  Ľudmila Cervanová (final round)
  Yuka Yoshida (Qualifier)

Qualifiers

  Wynne Prakusya
  Selima Sfar
  Yuka Yoshida
  Lenka Němečková

Draw

First qualifier

Second qualifier

Third qualifier

Fourth qualifier

References
 2001 Canberra International Draw

Singles